A constitutional referendum was held in the Gambia on 8 August 1996. The new constitution was approved by 70% of voters, with a voter turnout of 87%.

Background
Elected president Dawda Jawara was overthrown in a military coup led by Yahya Jammeh on 22 July 1994. Following the coup, Jammeh ruled Gambia by decree as head of the Armed Forces Provisional Ruling Council, with all political activity banned. He promised a return to civilian rule within four years, and a constitution was drawn up following a controversial consultation process.

The new constitution allowed for multiparty elections, an unlimited number of five year presidential terms and lowered the voting age from 21 to 18.

Results

Aftermath
Presidential elections were held in August 1996, which were won by Jammeh (despite him denying that he would stand until shortly before the election). In January 1997, parliamentary elections were held and won by Jammeh's Alliance for Patriotic Reorientation and Construction.

References

Gambia
1996 in the Gambia
Referendums in the Gambia
Constitutional referendums
August 1996 events in Africa